Michael James Wuertz (born December 15, 1978) is an American former professional baseball pitcher. He played in Major League Baseball (MLB) for the Chicago Cubs and Oakland Athletics. He was known for his slider, which generated the most misses per swing in 2009. He is currently the pitching coach for the Los Angeles Angels minor league affiliates.

Baseball career

Chicago Cubs 
Wuertz was drafted by the Chicago Cubs in the 11th round of the 1997 Major League Baseball Draft. He made his major league debut on April 5, 2004, against the Cincinnati Reds, throwing a perfect inning with two strikeouts. He ended the season with a record of 1-0 in 31 appearances. The following season, Wuertz opened the season in the Cubs bullpen and set a Cubs rookie record for games pitched with 75. In 2006, Wuertz spent part of the season on the disabled list, limited to 41 appearances. In 2007, Wuertz went 2-3 with an ERA of 3.48 in 73 appearances. In 2008, his last season with the Cubs, he was limited to 45 games due to injury.

Oakland Athletics 
On February 2, 2009, Wuertz was traded to the Oakland Athletics for minor leaguers Richie Robnett and Justin Sellers. In his first season with Oakland, he had the best season of his career, going 6-1 with 102 strikeouts in  innings. The following two seasons he was not able to replicate his success due to injury and inconsistency. He was released on October 25, 2011, after three seasons in Oakland.

Cincinnati Reds 
Wuertz was signed by the Cincinnati Reds to a minor league deal on May 2, 2012. He was released on July 5.

Miami Marlins
Wuertz was signed by the Miami Marlins to a minor league deal on January 15, 2013.  He was released on March 8.

Coaching career
In January 2016, he was named the pitching coach for the Inland Empire 66ers, the Los Angeles Angels Class-A affiliate in the California League. In February 2018, he was named the pitching coach for the Orem Owlz, a Los Angeles Angels Rookie League affiliate in the Pioneer League. In 2021, he was named the pitching coach for the Rocket City Trash Pandas, the Double-A affiliate of the Los Angeles Angels.

References

External links

1978 births
Living people
People from Austin, Minnesota
Baseball coaches from Minnesota
Baseball players from Minnesota
Major League Baseball pitchers
Chicago Cubs players
Oakland Athletics players
Williamsport Cubs players
Lansing Lugnuts players
Daytona Cubs players
West Tennessee Diamond Jaxx players
Iowa Cubs players
Stockton Ports players
Sacramento River Cats players
York Revolution players
Minor league baseball coaches